Spencer Armstrong (born June 2, 1986) is a professional Canadian football wide receiver who is currently a free agent. He was drafted by the Calgary Stampeders in the fourth round of the 2009 CFL Draft and signed with the team on August 5, 2013. He was traded to the Tiger-Cats on January 6, 2014. Armstrong was released by the Tiger-Cats in May 2014. He played college football for the Air Force Falcons.

References

External links
Just Sports Stats

1986 births
Living people
Canadian football wide receivers
Air Force Falcons football players
Calgary Stampeders players
Canadian expatriates in the United States
Canadian players of American football
Canadian football people from Toronto
Players of Canadian football from Ontario